Stavang is a village in Kinn Municipality in Vestland county, Norway.  The village is located on the mainland at the mouth of the Førdefjorden, where it empties into the Brufjorden, about  straight southeast of the town of Florø.  The islands of Stavøya, Askrova, and Svanøya lie off the coast of Stavang to the north, west, and southwest, respectively.  The village was the administrative centre of the old municipality of Bru which existed from 1923 until 1964.  The village is the site of Stavang Church which was built in 1957.

References

Villages in Vestland
Kinn